Bill Murray & Brian Doyle-Murray's Extra Innings is an American reality television series that premiered on November 20, 2017 on Facebook Watch. This show follows actors Bill Murray and Brian Doyle-Murray as they visit Minor League ballparks across the country, immersing themselves in the local culture and interacting with the different communities. Facebook ordered a ten episode first season of the show which premiered on November 20, 2017 with all subsequent episodes airing on the following Mondays.

Production

Development
Bill Murray described the show as “a little something to fill a baseball fan’s off-season hole in the heart.” In the series, the actors will visit minor league baseball teams including the Charleston RiverDogs, St. Paul Saints, Martha's Vineyard Sharks, and Kansas City T-Bones. They also spend time at the MLB Urban Youth Academy and the Negro Leagues Baseball Museum.

The idea for the show sprang from a chance meeting between Doyle-Murray and Oso founder Dub Cornett at a mutual friend’s birthday party. Oso Studios brought the concept to Ricky Van Veen, Facebook’s head of global creative strategy in charge of original entertainment content, who greenlit it immediately. The show was shot over the course of three months during the summer. Cornett took a relatively small crew on the road that included producer Victoria Shaffer, a camera operator, a sound tech and a PA.

Music
Murray performs the theme song for the show, "The Thing About Baseball", which he wrote alongside Doyle-Murray and Paul Shaffer.

Caddyshack
Murray reprised his role of Carl Spackler from the film Caddyshack in the show's premiere episode.

Episodes

Awards and nominations

See also
 List of original programs distributed by Facebook Watch

References

External links
 

Facebook Watch original programming
2010s American comedy television series
2010s American reality television series
2017 American television series debuts
2018 American television series endings
English-language television shows
American non-fiction web series
Bill Murray